African plum may refer to:

 Dacryodes edulis, African pear, a fruit tree native to Africa
 Prunus africana, African cherry, a tree native to central and southern Africa

See also
 Plum (disambiguation)

Plant common name disambiguation pages